Zeke Robert Markshausen (born January 26, 1987) is a former American football wide receiver for the Kansas City Chiefs of the National Football League (NFL). He was signed by the Chicago Bears as an undrafted free agent in 2010. He played college football at Northwestern.

Professional career
Following a mini-camp tryout, Markshausen was signed by the Chicago Bears on August 8, 2010. He was waived on August 30.

Markshausen spent the entire 2010 season out of football and signed with the Kansas City Chiefs on July 30, 2011. He was waived during final roster cuts on September 3, but was signed to the team's practice squad on November 30. He was released from the practice squad on December 4. Following the 2011 season, Markshausen re-signed with the Chiefs on February 29, 2012. He was released by the Chiefs on August 26, 2012.

Coaching history
In 2013, Markshausen accepted an offer to be the receivers coach at North Shore Country Day School in Winnetka, Illinois.

References

External links
Northwestern Wildcats bio

1987 births
Living people
American football wide receivers
Northwestern Wildcats football players
Chicago Bears players
Kansas City Chiefs players